Netawaka Township is a township in Jackson County, Kansas, USA.  As of the 2000 census, its population was 361.

History
Netawaka Township was formerly occupied by the Kickapoo Tribe in Kansas, until they were removed to a reservation in Brown County. It was bought by the Union Pacific Railroad in 1870 and opened for settlement. Netawaka Township was formed in 1871. Netawaka is a Native American name meaning "fair view".

Geography
Netawaka Township covers an area of 36.09 square miles (93.48 square kilometers); of this, 0.05 square miles (0.12 square kilometers) or 0.13 percent is water. The streams of Mosquito Creek and Wolfley Creek run through this township.

Cities and towns
 Netawaka

Adjacent townships
 Powhattan Township, Brown County (north)
 Whiting Township (east)
 Straight Creek Township (southeast)
 Liberty Township (south)
 Jefferson Township (southwest)
 Wetmore Township, Nemaha County (west)
 Granada Township, Nemaha County (northwest)

Major highways
 U.S. Route 75
 K-9

References
 U.S. Board on Geographic Names (GNIS)
 United States Census Bureau cartographic boundary files

External links
 US-Counties.com
 City-Data.com

Townships in Jackson County, Kansas
Townships in Kansas